Svarupananda Desikar was a noted Tamil scholar during the late 14th century – early 15th century. Among other writings, he is known for his anthology containing 2824 verses on the Advaita philosophy. This work is known as Sivaprakasap-perundirattu. Tattuvarayar was an ascetic scholar and disciple of Svarupananda Desikar. Kurunthirattu was written by him.

References
 K.A. Nilakanta Sastry, History of South India, From Prehistoric times to fall of Vijayanagar, 1955, OUP, New Delhi (Reprinted 2002) 

Tamil scholars
Scholars from Tamil Nadu
Indian Vaishnavites
14th-century Indian scholars
15th-century Indian scholars